Robert Madge may refer to:
 Robert Madge (businessman)
 Robert Madge (actor)